Central Secretariat may refer to:

China
Secretariat of the Chinese Communist Party, officially the "Central Secretariat of the Communist Party of China"
Zhongshu Sheng, one of the 3 central government departments in imperial China from 620 to 1380

India
Central Secretariat Service, an administrative civil service of India
Secretariat Building, New Delhi, location of the Cabinet Secretariat of India, also known as Central Secretariat
Central Secretariat metro station, a Delhi Metro station

See also
Secretariat (disambiguation)
Imperial Secretariat (disambiguation)